Télé Match was one of the first gameshows on French television.  It was created in 1954 by André Gillois, Pierre Bellemare and Jacques Antoine, broadcast on TF1, at that time the sole television channel of RTF, and presented by Pierre Bellemare.

References

1954 French television series debuts
1961 French television series endings
French game shows
1950s French television series
1960s French television series